The Protector of the Small quartet is a series of books written by Tamora Pierce that tells the story of Keladry of Mindelan, a heroine in the fictional kingdom of Tortall. This is the third series written in the Tortallian Universe, but forth in the in-universe timeline. It follows Keladry (known as Kel to her friends and family) as she seeks knighthood as the first girl to openly do so in centuries. Kel is one of the canonically confirmed queer characters written by Tamora Pierce, who explains that Kel is aromantic asexual (aroace) in the FAQ section of her website.

First Test
The story opens in the realm of Tortall, where women have been legally allowed to train for knighthood in the ten years since King Johnathan IV made the decree after Alanna the Lioness disclosed her gender 
publicly; however so far no one has tried. Keladry (Kel) is a serious 10-year-old who - with the support of her noble family who have just moved back from the Yamani islands after 6 years serving as diplomats - is determined to become the first official female knight of the realm in over a 100 years. (Sir Alanna was knighted when still disguising her gender, which was revealed afterwards.) Additionally, unlike Sir Alanna, Kel does not have magic. Conservative elements of Tortall's nobility are reluctant to let this happen for fear that it will derail training for the boys. One of the realms most outspoken conservatives, Wyldon of Cavall (who also happens to be the pages' training master), insists that Kel is put on a year of probation to determine her fitness for the program. While Kel is bitterly resentful of this additional burden atop the many other challenges that she has to face as the only girl in the entire training program, she is determined to prove to him that she is as good as any boy.

While initially Kel's only friend is her year-mate and sponsor, the contrary and academic Nealan (Neal) of Queenscove, she slowly finds her way with his help along with the assistance of a mysterious benefactor who occasionally sends her useful "gifts". Her determination, skill at arms - particularly with a Yamani glaive, which is her weapon of choice - and inborn sense of justice gain her both friends (including the animal kind!) and enemies.  Her primary opponent is fellow page, Joren of Stone Mountain, who has been marked by Wyldon as the best page in his year. Joren hates Kel's subversion of traditional practices. His unspoken antagonism takes physical form when Kel declares an unofficial war against the hazing of the first-year pages, something that Joren and his gang revel in. As Kel 'rescues' more and more victims, her circle of allies widens, and others join her in both fighting and friendship.

At the summer camp for pages which takes place at the end of the year, Kel and her friends assist Lord Raoul and the King's Own on a Spidren hunt. Her role in the skirmish that ensues showcases her natural ability as a leader. Her successes do not go unnoticed and at the end of the year Lord Wyldon surprises everyone by allowing Kel to continue to train to become a knight.

Page
Kel is now officially a page, but she has still to get through the next three years of training if she ever wants to fulfill her dream of becoming Tortall's first openly female knight. These three years are not going to be easy as she continues to deal with relationships, training, hormonal changes, and an unshakeable fear of heights (rooted in a cruel "prank" performed by an older brother when Kel was very young) while the public page examinations loom - something that will determine her future ever closer in the horizon.

At the outset of the book Joren, her archenemy, appears to have stopped tormenting her. While initially Kel is distrustful of this apparent reversal, eventually she lets go of her animosity. While Joren has backed away, another antagonist in the form of Vinson comes to the fore. Vinson is one of Joren's gang and also a squire. Kel catches him attacking her timid maid Lalasa Isran, who Kel recently hired at the bequest of Lalasa's uncle (a castle servant man named Gower) with the aim of protecting Lalasa from such incidents. While Kel successfully stops the assault, she is torn between her responsibility to report Vinson or stay silent to protect Lalasa's reputation. While she chooses silence, this decision weighs heavily upon her.

Despite these internal personal struggles, Kel's aptitude with weaponry and her skills as a leader continues to grow. Over the course of the book Kel's prowess with the lance, staff and bow is refined, and her knowledge of battle strategy is developed through mock fights. Her expertise serves her well when she and her friends are attacked by bandits whilst camping in the Royal Forest. Despite the overwhelming odds, Kel keeps a cool head and calmly orders her friends, leading them to safety until Lord Wyldon and his troops can arrive, once again demonstrating natural leadership abilities.

While Kel makes extraordinary progress throughout the book, her fear of heights torments her throughout her time as a page. Though Lord Wyldon attempts to force her to face her fears by assigning height related chores/punishments, she remains terrified until the day of her page examinations. 
An hour before the exams, she gets an anonymous message that Lalasa has been kidnapped and left atop Balor's Needle – the highest tower in Tortall. While Kel is determined to save her, she knows this mean both potentially missing the exams – the punishment for which is repeating the last four years of study – and confronting her own shortcomings. Despite these challenges, Kel climbs up the inner stairs of Balor's needle and then down the rickety, rusty, spiral staircase on the outside of Balor's Needle and successfully rescues Lalasa.

For her bravery, and because of the extenuating circumstances, Kel is allowed to retake the examinations alone; she passes with flying colors and officially becomes a Squire.

Squire
Kel's last hurdle before she can become a knight is spending four years as a squire.  Her new knight-master, Raoul of Golden Lake and Malorie's Peak and Lord Commander of the King's Own, is as different from her original master, Lord Wyldon, as a man could be. He introduces Kel to a new way of life, one that's as much fun as it is challenging.  He not only allows her to carry and use her chosen weapon, the Yamani glaive, but also helps her to take her skill at jousting to the next level in addition to nurturing her natural ability to lead. With his help, she becomes a formidable new force on the tournament field, sending shock waves through the world of young Tortallan knights-in-training, and intriguing young lady nobles, who are exposed to the genuine possibility of women training successfully to become knights.

It is in this book that a canonical reason for the updating of the Tortallian maps shown in all the books. Kel learns that a fast, skilled group of warriors known as the Queen's Riders - whose main job is quickly travel around Tortall and aid various groups of warriors as needed - has, in addition to their main duties, been tasked with map making. The Queen's Riders are constantly roving around the country, and draw maps as they travel that help improve the accuracy of the maps available.

As Kel travels with Raoul and his regiment - Third Company of the King's Own - she encounters Neal's handsome cousin Domitan, or Dom, as well as other interesting folk. When Raoul finds himself pressed into escorting the "progress," a group of noblemen and women who are traveling across the entire realm to celebrate Prince Roald and Princess Shinkokami's wedding, Kel has a chance to reunite with her childhood Yamani friends, including the Princess.

Old friends and foes appear: Neal of Queenscove, Owen of Jesslaw, Cleon of Kennan, and the still-bullying Joren of Stone Mountain.  Through it all, Kel never allows herself to forget what awaits her after her night-long vigil in Midwinter of her fourth year as a squire: the Chamber of the Ordeal. All her work eventually pays off and she eventually successfully emerges from the Chamber as Tortall's second Lady Knight.

Lady Knight
Lady Knight Keladry is now an official Knight of the Realm. As war with the neighboring country of Scanra is declared, Kel finds herself in charge of a refugee camp. While she fears that her district commander, Lord Wyldon, has given her this assignment because he views her combat skills as inferior to those of other men, he disproves this notion. He explains that she was chosen for her post because she is the only knight Wyldon knows that wouldn't discriminate against the poor and disenfranchised, using noble status for power rather than to help. Kel soon comes to realize that these refugees, torn from their homes, robbed of their wealth and self-respect, are her responsibility. She must feed them, house them, and keep them safe from harm, on a piece of ground that is far too close to the Scanran border. She is able to be a hero, even off the battlefield, and demonstrates her abilities as a leader independent of any mentors or knight-masters.

In her work, she receives help in the shape of her old friends Neal and Merric, the horses Peachblossom and Hoshi, the dog Jump, and her personal sparrow flock, as well as from mixed a myriad group of others: the Wildmage Daine; Daine's lover, the great mage Numair; Neal's own father, the healer Duke Baird of Queenscove; Kel's former knight-master Raoul of Goldenlake and Malorie's Peak; men of the King's Own (including Kel's friend and Neal's cousin Sergeant Domitan of Masbolle); convict soldiers who have been given the choice to fight in the army or to die at hard labor; several hundred disillusioned refugees who have received too many empty promises from nobles; smugglers; and a stolid, unusual boy named Tobe that, after Kel frees him from indentured servitude, dedicates himself to watching out for "his Lady."

While Kel struggles with her responsibilities and the urge simply to abandon the camp and find a real fight, another obligation hangs over her. Before the war began, she was given a task by the Chamber of the Ordeal: to find and destroy the mage who is using foul, evil magic to create the rat-like, swift-moving, deadly metallic things known to the Tortallans as "killing devices." But, tied to the camp, she cannot pursue it. However, as the summer wears on and the war intensifies, events move to put that perverted mage and his conscienceless war-leader in Kel's path, and at last her resolve is tested, and she and all of Tortall find out if she is truly worthy of her shield. Kel tricks her guards into letting her slip away from them, and pursue a journey to bring back her stolen refugees. She is quickly accompanied by her friends, and once and for all, given the chance to earn her name as a Lady Knight, protector of the small.

Characters

Lady Knight Keladry "Kel" of Mindelan: The protagonist of the series, a young noble striving to become the first official Lady Knight in Tortall in over one hundred years. She is the youngest daughter of Piers and Ilane of Mindelan, and has several older siblings. She spent six years of her childhood in the Yamani Islands, where her father, a Tortallan diplomat, negotiated a peace treaty between the two countries. As a result, Kel adopted several Yamani customs, which she continued to practice after returning to Tortall.
Sir Nealan "Neal" of Queenscove: Kel's first friend and year-mate in the training program. He is the son of Duke Baird of Queenscove, the chief of the palace healers. Neal has got a very strong healing Gift, which, like his father's, is emerald green. Neal is several years older than his year mates, since he initially studied healing at the university of Corus before deciding to carry on the family tradition of always having a Queenscove knight in royal service.
Wyldon of Cavall: Lord Wyldon, nicknamed "the Stump" by Neal, is the stiff, conservative training master when Kel tries for knighthood, and is the one to demand a year of probation for her, because she is a girl.
Joren of Stone Mountain: Joren is an enemy of Kel, and tries to drive her out. He has a group of followers who are against women being knights. He bullies first-pages, claiming that it is making them obedient. In Page, Joren seems to have changed, but it is later shown that this was just a ruse.
Lalasa Isran: A maid to Keladry, and niece to Gower Isran. Joren hired two thugs to kidnap her, and this made Kel face her fear of heights and overcome them. Once Kel becomes a squire, Lalasa transitions to being a full-fledged seamstress, even opening her own shop in Corus. She closes her shop early everyday to teach self-defense to the city girls.

Lord Raoul of Goldenlake and Malorie's Peak: Kel's knight-master when she is a squire. He is an old friend of Sir Alanna, and the Knight Commander of the King's Own. He teaches Kel that there is more than one way to help people, explaining that "Commanders are as rare as heroes. They are people with an eye not just for what they do, but for what those around them do as well."
 Tobe: A young boy Kel freed from indentured servitude. He goes on to dedicate himself to Kel, very insistent that someone has to make sure she takes care of himself. And Kel, always one to protect others, lets him do it.

References

Articles:
Lennard, John."Reading Tamora Pierce's The Protector of the Small"
Melano, Anne L. "Utopias of Violence: Pierce's Knights of Tortall and the Contemporary Heroic" (Crossroads: An Interdisciplinary Journal for the Study of History, Philosophy, Religion and Classics, vol 3 issue 2, 2009)

Series of children's books
Fantasy novel series
 3 Protector of the Small